Dusenbery is a surname. Notable people with the surname include:

David B. Dusenbery (born 1948), American biophysicist
Bill Dusenbery (born 1970), American football player
Walter Dusenbery (born 1939), American sculptor
Warren Newton Dusenberry (1836–1915), American educator

See also
Dusenberry